Kurt Urbancic (born 2 March 1929) was an Austrian racing cyclist. He rode in the 1954 Tour de France.

References

1929 births
Possibly living people
Austrian male cyclists
Place of birth missing (living people)